Eriboll (Scottish Gaelic: Earabol) is a village in Sutherland, Scotland. The village is situated on the south eastern shore of Loch Eriboll, in the northern part of the former county of Sutherland.

The main A838 coast road connects the villages of Tongue, Achuvoldrach, Hope and Eriboll to the east and Portnancon, Sangobeg, Durness and on to Laxford Bridge to the west.

Its Norse name means Home on a gravel beach.

References

Populated places in Sutherland
Eriboll